Touch the Lion's Paw is a 1975 thriller novel by the British writer Derek Lambert. The plot revolves around a major diamond heist carried out in Amsterdam.

Adaptation
In 1980 it was adapted into the film Rough Cut directed by Don Siegel and starring Burt Reynolds, Lesley-Anne Down and David Niven.

References

Bibliography
 Burton, Alan. Historical Dictionary of British Spy Fiction. Rowman & Littlefield, 2016.
 Goble, Alan. The Complete Index to Literary Sources in Film. Walter de Gruyter, 1999.

1975 British novels
Novels by Derek Lambert
British thriller novels
British novels adapted into films
Novels set in Amsterdam
Novels set in London
E. P. Dutton books